This page details Netherlands men's national football team records; the most capped players, the players with the most goals, Netherlands' match record by opponent and decade.

Honours

Major tournaments 

 FIFA World Cup:
 Runners-up (3): 1974, 1978, 2010
 Third place (1): 2014
 Fourth place (1): 1998
 UEFA European Championship:
 Winners (1): 1988
 Third place (1): 1976
 Semi-finals (3): 1992, 2000, 2004
 UEFA Nations League:
 Runners-up (1): 2019
 Olympic football tournament:
 Bronze medal/Third place (3): 1908, 1912, 1920
 Fourth place (1): 1924

Friendly tournaments 
 Olympic Football Consolation Tournament
 Winners: 1928
 75th Anniversary FIFA Cup
 Runners-up: 1979
 World Champions' Gold Cup
 Fourth Place: 1980
 Copa Confraternidad
 Runners-up: 2011

Individual records

Player records

Most-capped players 

Last updated: 29 November 2022 Source: voetbalstats.nl

Top goalscorers 

Last updated: 29 November 2022 Source: voetbalstats.nl

Hat-tricks 

Robin van Persie scored four goals for the Dutch national side during their 11–0 win over minnows San Marino on 2 September 2011. He scored three goals in the 2014 FIFA World Cup qualifier against Hungary on 11 October 2013.

Last updated: 19 November 2021 Source: voetbalstats.nl

Age records 
 Oldest player to make debut: Sander Boschker, aged 39 years and 256 days vs , 1 June 2010
 Youngest player to make debut: Jan van Breda Kolff, aged 17 years and 74 days vs , 2 April 1911 RSSSF
 Oldest player to score: Abe Lenstra, aged 38 years and 143 days  vs , 19 April 1959
 Youngest player to score: Jan van Breda Kolff, aged 17 years and 74 days vs , 2 April 1911

Progression of the Netherlands association football goalscoring record 
This is a progressive list of association footballers who have held or co-held the record for international goals for the Netherlands national football team.

For the early decades, records of players appearances and goals were often considered unreliable. RSSSF and IFFHS have spent much effort trying to produce definitive lists of full international matches, and corresponding data on players' international caps and goals. Using this data, the following records can be retrospectively produced. Note that, at the time, these records may not have been recognised.

Manager records

Team records

Tournament records 

 The Netherlands used all 23 players during the 2014 World Cup, making it the first team in World Cup history to ever use all of its squad players.
 World Cup appearances: 11 (most recent in 2022)
 Most successful World Cup appearance: Runners-up (1974, 1978, 2010)
 European Championship appearances: 10 (most recent in 2020)
 Most successful European Championship appearance: Winners (1988)
 Summer Olympics appearances: 8 (most recent in 2008)
 Most successful Olympics appearance: Third place (1908, 1912, 1920)

Match records

Firsts 
 First match:  1–4  (Antwerp, Belgium; 30 April 1905)
 First World Cup finals match:  3–2  (Milan, Italy; 27 May 1934)
 First European Championship finals match:  1–3  (Zagreb, Yugoslavia; 16 June 1976)

Record results 
 Biggest win:
 11–0  (Eindhoven, Netherlands; 2 September 2011)
 Biggest loss:
England AM.  12–2  (Darlington, England; 21 December 1907)

Head-to-head records 

 Draws include penalty shoot-outs.

Rankings

FIFA 
 Highest FIFA Rank: 1 (August 2011)
 Lowest FIFA Rank: 32 (April 2017)
 FIFA Team of the Year First place: 1
 2000
 FIFA Team of the Year Third place: 3
 2005, 2008, 2009

Elo 
 Highest Elo ranking: 1(June 1978, June 1988 – June 1990, June–September 1992, June 2002, June–September 2003, October 2005, June 2008, July 2010, June 2014)
 Lowest Elo Ranking: 56 (October 1954)

References 

 
Dutch national records
National association football team records and statistics